Connor Brent Ingram (born March 31, 1997) is a Canadian professional ice hockey goaltender for the Arizona Coyotes of the National Hockey League (NHL). He was drafted in the third round, 88th overall, by the Tampa Bay Lightning at the 2016 NHL Entry Draft.

Playing career

Junior
After playing at various different levels of youth hockey, he joined the Kamloops Blazers of the Western Hockey League for the 2014–15 WHL season. He appeared in 52 games, posting a 21–21–5 record, along with a .904 save percentage and 2.96 goals allowed average. In the 2015–16 WHL season, Ingram helped lead the Blazers to a playoff appearance. He had a much larger role on the team, appearing in 61 games, posting a 34–15–9 record with a .922 save percentage and 2.61 goals allowed average. Despite his efforts, the Blazers were eliminated in the first round by the Kelowna Rockets.

Following the 2015–16 WHL season, Ingram was drafted in the third round, 88th overall, by the Tampa Bay Lightning.

Ingram started the 2016–17 WHL season with the Blazers. He played in 45 games with the Blazers, posting a 26–14–2 record along with a .927 save percentage and a 2.44 goals allowed average. The Blazers qualified for the playoffs once again, but were again eliminated by Kelowna in the first round.

Professional
On April 4, 2017, Ingram and the Lightning agreed on a three-year, entry-level contract. He was also signed to an amateur try out with the Syracuse Crunch on the same day. He did not make an appearance with the Crunch for the rest of their season.

 
Ingram made his professional debut on October 7, 2017 with the Crunch. He made 15 saves on 18 shots in an overtime loss to the Rochester Americans. Ingram recorded his first professional win three weeks later on October 21. He stopped 23 of 24 shots in a 4–1 Crunch win over the Springfield Thunderbirds. On December 9, 2017, Ingram stopped all 18 shots he faced to record his professional shutout over the Belleville Senators. Ingram would finish the regular season with a 20–11–2 record with four shutouts along with a .914 save percentage and 2.33 goals allowed average to help lead the Crunch to the 2018 Calder Cup playoffs. He would split time with Edward Pasquale in the playoffs, posting a 1–3 record with a .904 save percentage and 3.07 goals allowed average. The Crunch would be eliminated in the second round by the eventual Calder Cup champions, the Toronto Marlies.

Ingram spent the 2018–19 season split between the Syracuse Crunch and the Orlando Solar Bears, the ECHL affiliate of the Lightning. In his time with the Crunch, he was an AHL All-Star, posting a 14–7–0 record with six shutouts, a .922 save percentage and 2.26 goals allowed average. In his time with the Solar Bears, Ingram posted an 8–2–0 record with a .914 save percentage and 2.81 goals allowed average. In 10 playoff games with the Solar Bears, he posted a 5–2–3 record along with a .935 save percentage and a 1.94 goals allowed average. The Solar Bears would be eliminated in the second round by the Florida Everblades.

On June 14, 2019, the Nashville Predators announced that they had acquired Ingram in exchange for a seventh-round pick in the 2021 NHL Entry Draft.

On October 24, 2021, Ingram recorded his first NHL win with the Predators, making 33 saves in a 5–2 win over the Minnesota Wild. Ingram's first win came nearly 9 months after entering the league's player assistance program.

On October 10, 2022, Ingram was claimed off waivers by the Arizona Coyotes. On February 15, 2023, Ingram recorded his first NHL shutout in a 1–0 shootout win against the Tampa Bay Lightning, while making 47 saves and setting the NHL record for saves by a rookie in their first career shutout.

Career statistics

Awards and honors

References

External links
 

1997 births
Living people
Adirondack Thunder players
Arizona Coyotes players
Canadian ice hockey goaltenders
Chicago Wolves players
Ice hockey people from Saskatchewan
IF Björklöven players
Kamloops Blazers players
Milwaukee Admirals players
Nashville Predators players
Orlando Solar Bears (ECHL) players
Sportspeople from Saskatoon
Syracuse Crunch players
Tampa Bay Lightning draft picks